The Under-20 Intercontinental Cup is a football match organised by CONMEBOL and UEFA. The match is contested by the winners of the South American and European youth club competitions, the U-20 Copa Libertadores and UEFA Youth League, respectively. Organised as a biennial one-off match, it is a youth team equivalent to the former Intercontinental Cup, which featured the senior club champions of Europe and South America. The competition was launched in 2022 as part of a renewed partnership between CONMEBOL and UEFA. Portuguese side Benfica won the first edition in 2022.

History
On 12 February 2020, UEFA and CONMEBOL signed a renewed memorandum of understanding meant to enhance cooperation between the two organisations. As part of the agreement, a joint UEFA–CONMEBOL committee examined the possibility of staging European–South American intercontinental matches, for both men's and women's football and across various age groups. On 15 December 2021, UEFA and CONMEBOL again signed a renewed memorandum of understanding lasting until 2028, which included specific provisions on opening a joint office in London and the potential organisation of various football events.

The Joint Representation Office was officially opened by CONMEBOL and UEFA on 4 April 2022, a meeting in which the creation of the Under-20 Intercontinental Cup would have been confirmed by both confederations.

On 2 June 2022, the day after staging the 2022 Finalissima, CONMEBOL and UEFA officially announced a series of new events between teams from the two confederations. This included the first Under-20 Intercontinental Cup, a match between the winners of South America's U-20 Copa Libertadores, an under-20 competition, and the winners of Europe's UEFA Youth League, an under-19 competition. The first winners of the competition were Portuguese club Benfica, winners of the 2021–22 UEFA Youth League, who defeated South American side Peñarol, winners of the 2022 U-20 Copa Libertadores, after a 1–0 victory at the Estadio Centenario in Montevideo, Uruguay.

Winners

Performances

By club

By nation

By confederation

See also
 Intercontinental Cup (football)
 CONMEBOL–UEFA Cup of Champions

References

External links
 

Youth Club Championship
Youth Club Championship
South American youth sports competitions
European youth sports competitions
Recurring sporting events established in 2022
2022 establishments in South America
2022 establishments in Europe